Nawnghoi is a mountain of the Shan Hills. It is located in Shan State, Burma, 122 km to the ENE of Longkam.

Geography
The nearest villages are Panglong, about 2 km to the west, and Song Möng Sihsu located on the eastern side at the foot of the mountain. The Salween river flows southwards 2 km to the east.

See also
List of mountains in Burma

References

External links
Google Books, The Physical Geography of Southeast Asia

Geography of Shan State
Mountains of Myanmar
Shan Hills